Spring Farm is a suburb of the Macarthur Region of Sydney in the state of New South Wales, Australia in Camden Council. It is on the east side of the Nepean River. Until recently, it was mainly farmland with a winery, an electricity substation and the Spring Farm Advanced Resource Recovery Facility, but it is currently in the process of suburban redevelopment.

History

The area now known as Spring Farm was probably originally home to the Tharawal people, based in the Illawarra region, although the Western Sydney-based Darug people and the Southern Highlands-based Gandangara people were also known to have inhabited the greater Camden area. Very early relations with British settlers were cordial but as farmers started clearing and fencing the land affecting food resources in the area, clashes between the groups arose until 1816 when a number of indigenous people were massacred and the remainder retreated from direct conflict with the settlers.

In 1805, wool pioneer John Macarthur, was granted 5,000 acres (20 km2) at Cowpastures. After the land was cleared, it was used for farming for most of the next 200 years until Sydney's suburban sprawl reached the town of Camden and the farmland was subdivided into housing blocks.

Transport
Spring Farm is off the Camden Bypass. There are a number of bus services controlled by Busabout Sydney that run through the suburb. The nearest railway station is Macarthur.

Landmarks

Springs Lake
Springs Lake is a man made lake in Spring Farm with a timber boardwalk, and picnic facilities.

Spring Farm Dog Park
Spring Farm Dog Park opened in July 2016 and can be located next to Springs Lake near Burrell Road.

Governance 
Spring Farm lies in the south ward of Camden Council, currently represented by Debby Dewbery, Eva Campbell and Greg Copeland. The suburb is contained within the federal electorate of Division of Hume, represented by Angus Taylor (Liberal), and the state electorate of Camden, currently held by Chris Patterson (Liberal).

Education 
There is one public school in the area. Spring Farm Public School was built in 2016 and is located on Barley Road.

References

External links
  [CC-By-SA]

Suburbs of Sydney
Camden Council (New South Wales)